Nicoloso da Recco was a 14th-century Italian navigator from  Genoa, who visited the Canary Islands in 1341 on behalf of Afonso IV of Portugal. He is credited with providing the first reliable account of the language used by the aboriginal inhabitants of the Canary Islands, the Guanches. 

An Italian Navy destroyer, Nicoloso da Recco, bore his name during  World War II.

Recco, Nicoloso da
Recco, Nicoloso da
History of the Canary Islands
14th-century explorers